The Lonsdale Cup is awarded annually by the New Zealand Olympic Committee (NZOC) to a New Zealand athlete (or team) who has demonstrated the most outstanding contribution to an Olympic or Commonwealth sport during the previous year.

The cup is a scale replica of the original Queen Anne cup of the same design presented by Lord Lonsdale during the 1911 Festival of Empire meeting. Originally won by Canada, it was subsequently given to the British Empire Games Federation to ensure its best use as an Empire Games trophy.

Due to its impractical size and the Federation deciding not to award such a trophy for the Games, the original was melted down in 1934, and smaller scale cups were given to the British Empire Games Associations in existence at the time.

It is on permanent display at the NZOC's New Zealand Olympic Museum, with athletes receiving a scale replica.

Recipients
New Zealand's Lonsdale Cup has been awarded annually since 1961.

References

New Zealand at the Olympics
New Zealand sports trophies and awards